Below is a list of international prime ministerial trips made by Yousaf Raza Gilani, the 19th Prime Minister of Pakistan. He has made 43 international trips in his premiership.

The number of visits per country where he travelled are:

2008

2009

References

Yousaf Raza Gillani
Foreign relations of Pakistan
Gilani, Yousuf Raza